Brewster Park may refer to:

Hamilton Park (New Haven), formerly Brewster Park, a former baseball ground located in New Haven, Connecticut
Brewster Park (Enniskillen), a Gaelic sports ground in Enniskillen, Northern Ireland